The 1959 Glover Trophy was a motor race, held on 30 March 1959 at Goodwood Circuit, England. To avoid competing with the Lavant Cup race the Glover Trophy was decreed to be strictly for Formula One cars only and as such, ran to Formula One rules. The race was watched by The 40,000 people, ran for 42 laps of the circuit, and was won by British driver Stirling Moss in a Cooper T51.

Results

References
 "The Grand Prix Who's Who", Steve Small, 1995.
 Results at www.silhouet.com 

Glover Trophy
Glover Trophy
20th century in West Sussex
Glover
Glover Trophy